The Bulabog Putian National Park is a protected wildlife and natural park located in the towns of Dingle and San Enrique in the province of Iloilo on the island of Panay in the Western Visayas region. The park covers an area of  along a  trail in this rainforest. It was established in 1961 through Proclamation No. 760 signed by President Carlos P. Garcia. The park is known for its unique geological formation and is the only limestone mountain formation in Iloilo. It is also known as the location of the Cry of Lincud that started the Philippine Revolution in Iloilo in 1898.

Description
It spans the Dingle barangays of Moroboro, Lincud, Camambugan, Caguyuman, and Tulatulaan, and the San Enrique barangays of Rumagayray, Campo, Palje, and Lip-ac. The park's central feature is the Bulabog Putian mountains, which contain the  Putian Peak, the highest in Central Iloilo dominating the surrounding plains. The mountain was named for its most distinguishing feature, a white stone wall on the north side that is visible from as far away as Passi.

The park also contains 13 caves, the most prominent of which are the Maestranza Cave, Guiso Cave, and Lapuz Lapuz Cave. The Maestranza Cave is a habitat of an estimated 20,000 fruit bats while the Guiso Cave is home to 18 different species of bats. It also has several springs including the Moroboro Spring. On the park's eastern side lies Lake Bito. A dam of the Jalaur River can also be found in the park.

Biodiversity
The Bulabog Putian National Park supports diverse species of plants and animals. Among its fauna inhabitants are the Philippine coucal, iguanas, monkeys, turtle doves, green imperial pigeons, reptiles, and several species of bats. As a secondary growth forest, it supports hardwood tree species such as dao, molave, and narra.

References

See also

List of national parks of the Philippines

National parks of the Philippines
Protected areas established in 1961
1961 establishments in the Philippines
Geography of Iloilo
Tourist attractions in Iloilo